Aquamarine Power was a wave energy company, founded in 2005 to commercialise the Oyster wave energy converter, a device to capture energy from near-shore waves. The company's head offices were in Edinburgh, Scotland. The company ceased to trade on 20 November 2015.

History
The Oyster concept originated from studies conducted in 2003 by the wave power research team at Queen's University, Belfast, led by Professor Trevor Whittaker. The studies were co-funded by the Engineering and Physical Sciences Research Council and Allan Thomson, who had previously founded and led the UK's first commercial wave energy company, Wavegen.

In 2005, Thomson founded Aquamarine Power to progress the commercialisation of the Oyster device. In 2007 Scottish & Southern Energy subsidiary Renewable Technology Ventures Limited invested in Aquamarine with a further investment in 2010. In February 2009, Aquamarine Power and Queen's University signed an agreement to extend their R&D partnership to 2014.
 
In February 2009, Aquamarine Power signed an agreement with renewable energy company Airtricity, a subsidiary of Scottish & Southern Energy, to develop marine energy sites using the Oyster system. In November 2009, the first full-scale, 315 kW, demonstrator Oyster began producing power when it was launched at the European Marine Energy Centre (EMEC) on Orkney.

In March 2012, Aquamarine announced plans to install 50 Oyster devices on the seabed off the Western Isles in Scotland (provisionally dubbed the Orkney Wave Power Station). The project was intended to be able to supply electricity to more than 38,000 homes (2.4 MW in installed capacity).

Key people 
The company's chief executive officer was Martin McAdam, who joined in 2008. The company was advised by Trevor Whittaker, inventor of the Oyster concept, and by Stephen Salter, inventor of the Salter's Duck.

Investors
In November 2009, Aquamarine Power announced an investment of £11 million in the business. The principal investor during this investment round was ABB Group who invested £8 million. The other investors during the round included Scottish and Southern Energy who invested £2.7 million with other historical investors making up the balance of £300k. The investors in the business include: ABB, SSE, Sigma Capital Group, Scottish Enterprise and others.

Awards
Aquamarine Power won several awards. In 2008, it was named Emerging Technology Promoter of the Year in the Ernst & Young Euromoney Global Renewable Energy Awards. In 2009, it was named Innovator of the Year by the British Renewable Energy Association. It also received the Innovation Award for Energy at the Engineer Technology and Innovation Awards 2009 and Scottish Green Awards for the Best Green Industry SME. In 2010 it was listed on the GlobalCleantech 100 list.

Administration
On 28 October 2015, BBC News reported that Aquamarine Power had called in administrators. No buyer was found and less than a month later, on 20 November, the company ceased to trade with the loss of fourteen jobs.

See also
Marine energy

References

Renewable energy technology companies
Renewable energy companies of Scotland
Defunct electric power companies of the United Kingdom
Wave farms in Scotland
Companies based in Edinburgh
Energy companies established in 2005
Renewable resource companies established in 2005
2005 establishments in Scotland
2015 disestablishments in Scotland
British companies established in 2005
British companies disestablished in 2015
Renewable resource companies disestablished in 2015